Luzern Allmend/Messe railway station is a railway station in the city of Lucerne, in the Swiss canton of Lucerne. It is located adjacent to the Swissporarena, in the south of the city. The station is on the Brünig line of the Zentralbahn railway company, and is used by trains of the Luzern–Stans–Engelberg line.

History 

The station opened in December 2012, and is situated in a tunnel linking Kriens Mattenhof station and the approaches to Lucerne station. The tunnel replaces a less direct surface alignment, allowing the abolition of several congested level crossings and the provision of double track. The new station gives access for an estimated 500,000 people per year, to the nearby sports, leisure and exhibition facilities.

Services 
 the following services stop at Luzern Allmend/Messe:

Luzern Allmend/Messe also receives cargo thru-traffic on track 2 serving industries near Horw. This cargo traffic is standard gauge, requiring the use of dual gauge track on one of the two mainline tracks until the serviced industries.

References

External links 
 

Railway stations in the canton of Lucerne
Buildings and structures in Lucerne
Transport in Lucerne
Zentralbahn stations
Railway stations in Switzerland opened in 2012